(Pyruvate, water dikinase) kinase (PSRP, PEPS kinase) is an enzyme with systematic name ADP:(pyruvate, water dikinase) phosphotransferase. This enzyme catalyses the following chemical reaction

 ADP + [pyruvate, water dikinase]  AMP + [pyruvate, water dikinase] phosphate

The enzyme from the bacterium Escherichia coli is bifunctional.

References

External links 
 

EC 2.7.11